The 2016 Dutch Basketball Supercup was the 6th edition of the Dutch Basketball Supercup. The game was played between Shooters Den Bosch, the winner of the 2015–16 Dutch Basketball League, and Donar, the winner of the 2015–16 NBB Cup.

Match details

References

Dutch Basketball Supercup
Supercup